The 2004 OFC Women's Olympic Qualifying Tournament was an association football tournament used two determine the Oceanian participant to compete at the 2004 Summer Olympics. It was held at Govind Park in Ba, Fiji, from March 2–6, 2004. It was the first edition of the OFC Women's Olympic Qualifying Tournament (with previous competitions using FIFA Women's World Cup performances for qualification). Three nations participated.

Tournament
Times listed are UTC+12.

Goalscorers
4 goals
 Kate Gill
 April Mann

3 goals
 Lana Harch

2 goals
 Lisa De Vanna

1 goal
 Gillian Foster
 Selin Kuralay
 Joanne Peters
 Sarah Walsh
 Tokoe Norrie
 Nellie Taman

See also
2004 OFC Men's Olympic Football Tournament

Notes

References

External links
2004 OFC Women's Olympic Qualifiers

Oceania
OFC Women's Olympic Qualifying Tournament
2003–04 in OFC football
International association football competitions hosted by Fiji
Oly